Daniel Callaghan may refer to:

 Daniel J. Callaghan (1890–1942), United States Navy officer and Medal of Honor recipient
 Daniel Callaghan (politician) (1786–1849), Irish businessman and politician

See also
Daniel O'Callaghan